is a train station on the Minobu Line of Central Japan Railway Company (JR Central) located in the town of Ichikawamisato, Nishiyatsushiro District, Yamanashi Prefecture, Japan.

Lines
Kai-Iwama Station is served by the Minobu Line and is located 60.3 kilometers from the southern terminus of the line at Fuji Station.

Layout
Kai-Iwama Station has one island platform connected to the station building by a level crossing. The station is unattended.

Platforms

Adjacent stations

History
Kai-Iwama Station was opened on December 17, 1927 as a station on the Fuji-Minobu Line. The line came under control of the Japanese Government Railways on May 1, 1941. The JGR became the JNR (Japan National Railway) after World War II. Along with the division and privatization of JNR on April 1, 1987, the station came under the control and operation of the Central Japan Railway Company. The station has been unattended since April 1, 1999. The station building was rebuilt in May 2005.

Surrounding area
 former Rokugo Town Hall

See also
 List of railway stations in Japan

External links

 Minobu Line station information	

Railway stations in Japan opened in 1927
Railway stations in Yamanashi Prefecture
Minobu Line
Ichikawamisato, Yamanashi